Johanna Sacco (Prague 16 November 1754- 21 December 1802, Vienna) was an Austrian ballet dancer and stage actor.  

She was engaged at the Burgtheater in 1776-1793 and enjoyed widespread fame and popularity among all classes of Viennese society.

References 

 Karl Gutkas: Österreich zur Zeit Kaiser Joseph II, Niederösterreich Kultur, 1980, S. 643.

1754 births
1802 deaths
18th-century Austrian ballet dancers
18th-century Austrian actresses
Austrian stage actresses